Farlen Ilama Solís (born 25 August 1972 in San Isidro de El General) is a retired Costa Rican football player, who played the majority of his career for Pérez Zeledón.

Club career
A short-built striker, Ilama made his professional debut on 19 January 1992 for hometown club Pérez Zeledón against Alajuelense and played a total of 221 games for the club, scoring 70 goals. He had trials with German Zweite Bundesliga sides Carl Zeiss Jena, Wattenscheid and Waldhof Mannheim in 1995, but no transfer materialized. He also played for Costa Rica giants Saprissa, joining them in summer 1997, as well as Carmelita, Municipal Osa before returning at Pérez Zeledón in 2003, six months after leaving an alcohol clinic. He then moved to Ramonense in 2004 and finished his career in 2005. He however returned to Carmelita in 2007.

As of March 2003, Ilama totalled 367 league games, scoring 90 goals, ending up with 399 games and 97 goals. During his career, Ilama battled an alcohol addiction.

International career
Ilama made his debut for Costa Rica in a May 1992 friendly match against Ecuador and earned a total of 12 caps, scoring 2 goals. He represented his country in 2 FIFA World Cup qualification matches, scoring in his final international game.

His final international was a November 1997 FIFA World Cup qualification match against Canada.

International goals
Scores and results list. Costa Rica's goal tally first.

Personal life
He has a daughter, Anyale Kharina, from his first marriage and another child with his second wife.

References

External links
 

1972 births
Living people
People from Pérez Zeledón (canton)
Association football forwards
Costa Rican footballers
Costa Rica international footballers
Municipal Pérez Zeledón footballers
Deportivo Saprissa players
A.D. Carmelita footballers
A.D. Ramonense players